An ice cloud is a colloid of ice particles dispersed in air. The term has been used to refer to clouds of both water ice and carbon dioxide ice on Mars.
  Such clouds can be sufficiently large and dense to cast shadows on the Martian surface.

Cirrus and noctilucent clouds on Earth contain ice particles.

See also 
IceCube (spacecraft), a satellite used to map ice clouds

References 

Atmosphere of Mars